Conosyrphus is a genus of 2 species of Hoverfly, one (volucellinus) a unique endemic of the Caucasus region and the other characteristic of the Siberian arctic.

Species
Conosyrphus tolli Frey, 1915
Conosyrphus volucellinus (Portschinsky, 1881)

References

Diptera of Asia
Hoverfly genera
Eristalinae